John the Deacon (fl. 500) was a deacon in the Church of Rome during the pontificate of Pope Symmachus (498–514). He is known only from an epistle he wrote to a Senarius, a vir illustris who had asked him to explain aspects of Christian initiatory practice. John's response provides a "rather full description" of the catechumenal process and initiation rites at Rome at the beginning of the 6th century. He covers prebaptismal exorcisms; the ritual use of salt; the anointing of the ears, nostrils, and breast of the candidate; the use of milk and honey for first communion; ritual nudity and immersion; special white clothing for the newly baptized; and the need for even infants to undergo the process, saying that

Sources

 Maxwell E. Johnson, The Rites of Christian Initiation: Their Evolution and Interpretation. Liturgical Press, 2nd ed. 2007, pp. 164–168.

Notes

External links
For an English translation of a portion of John's letter, see Maxwell E. Johnson, The Rites of Christian Initiation pp. 165ff., limited preview online.

Deacons
6th-century Christian clergy